Char Fasson is a town and municipality in Bhola District in the division of Barisal, Bangladesh. It is the administrative headquarter and urban centre of Char Fasson Upazila.

References

See also
Char Fasson Upazila

Populated places in Bhola District
Bhola District